Trophon ohlini is a species of sea snail, a marine gastropod mollusk in the family Muricidae, the murex snails or rock snails.

Description
The shell can grow to be 12 mm to 15 mm in length.

Distribution
It can be found in the southern Atlantic Ocean off of Argentina and the Falkland Islands.

References

Gastropods described in 1904
Trophon